John Carr was an English player of English billiards.

Biography 
In about 1815, Carr took a job as a billiard marker at the Upper Rooms in Bath, a role that involved keeping the score of billiards matches. Carr would claim that these shots were possible due to the use of a special "twisting ," which he would sell for half a crown a box. The boxes actually contained normal chalk.

Carr successfully played challenge matches for money, but lost most of his winnings through gambling. He had a successful playing tour in Spain playing the Spanish version of billiards, but, as he had in England, soon lost most of the proceeds.

Carr success in challenge matches for money led to him having backers for him to play for 100 guineas a side against any challenger by 1825.

In 1825 Kentfield challenged Carr, but Carr was too ill to play, and Kentfield assumed the title of Champion, for which he was unchallenged for 24 years.

References

External links
 "Kentfield & Carr" at the Billiard and Snooker Heritage Collection.

English players of English billiards